Two ships of the Royal Navy have borne the name HMS Saumarez, after Admiral James Saumarez, 1st Baron de Saumarez:

  was a  launched in 1916 and sold in 1931.
  was an S-class destroyer launched in 1942 and sold in 1950.

Royal Navy ship names